Muhammad Mokaev (born 30 July 2000) is an English mixed martial artist and freestyle wrestler who currently competes in the flyweight division of the Ultimate Fighting Championship (UFC). He formerly competed in Brave Combat Federation (BCF). As of January 24, 2023, he is #12 in the UFC flyweight rankings.

Background 
Mokaev was born in Buynaksk, Dagestan, Russia, to a Kumyk family. His father and him moved to England at the age of 12, soon after his mother passed away. They were placed in a refugee camp in Liverpool upon their arrival, being given £5 a day to get by. They were soon moved to Wigan in their first month in the UK. He had tried his hand in freestyle wrestling in Dagestan, but only started enjoying it when he joined the Manchester Wrestling Club in 2013 and started competing. Mokaev is twice a British Championship medallist and an English National champion (twice medallist), and has competed at the 2021 U23 World Championships and the 2021 Ion Corneanu & Ladislau Simon Memorial. In the junior level, he is a four-time British Champion, winning the tournament from 2014 to 2017, and also competed at the 2017 European Championships.

Mokaev picked up Brazilian jiu-jitsu and submission wrestling as well, becoming a two-time ADCC UK champion (intermediate division) in the latter.

Mixed martial arts career

Early career
Mokaev made his amateur MMA debut in November 2015 and compiled four wins by the end of the following year in 2016. On 11 February 2017, Mokaev became the flyweight champion for Tanko FC, defeating his opponent via unanimous decision. He was 16 years old at the time. Over the next four years he would go undefeated, finishing off as champion as IMMAF Amateur junior bantamweight champion in 2018 and 2019. Originally Mokaev started training in MMA at Kaobon MMA gym in Liverpool under the tutelage of Colin Heron. He worked and earned his gym membership by cleaning mats at the gym.

Mixed martial arts

Brave Combat Federation
Mokaev debuted on 1 August 2020, against Glenn McVeigh, in Sweden under the Brave Combat Federation 37 card. He scored a unanimous decision victory. He received a "Fight of the Night Bonus" for this fight.

His third fight was against Jamie Kelly, from Rochdale, fighting out of SBG gym under Martin Stapleton. He won the fight fight via a rear-naked choke, and received a "Fight of the Night" bonus.

His next fight was against Dave Jones under the Celtic Gladiator 28 promotion in Glasgow and he won the fight in the third round.

Mokaev faced Abdul Hussein at the Brave Combat Federation 49. It was described as "15 minutes of non-stop scrambling". The fight was won by decision by Mokaev.

His fight with Ibragim Nazurov at Brave Combat Federation 51 was ruled as a no-contest due to a low kick when Ibragim Nazurov was deemed unable to continue after absorbing a first round low blow.

He faced Blaine O'Driscoll at Brave Combat Federation 54 and won the fight via rear-naked choke in the second round.

Ultimate Fighting Championship
On 17 November 2021, Mokaev signed with UFC.

Mokaev made his UFC debut against Cody Durden on 19 March 2022. He won the fight via guillotine choke in round one. With this win, he received the Performance of the Night award.

Mokaev faced Charles Johnson in his second UFC bout on 23 July 2022, at UFC Fight Night 212. He won the fight via unanimous decision.

Mokaev faced Malcolm Gordon on 22 October 2022, at UFC 280. He won the fight via armbar in the third round.

Mokaev faced Jafel Filho on March 18, 2023 at UFC 286. He won the fight via a neck crack submission in the third round.

Championships and accomplishments

Mixed martial arts
Ultimate Fighting Championship
Performance of the Night (One time)

Mixed martial arts record

|-
|Win
|align=center|
|Jafel Filho
|Submission (neck crank)
|UFC 286
|
|align=center|3
|align=center|4:32
|London, England
|
|-
|Win
|align=center|9–0 (1)
|Malcolm Gordon
|Submission (armbar)
|UFC 280
|
|align=center|3
|align=center|4:26
|Abu Dhabi, United Arab Emirates
|
|-
|Win
| align=center|8–0 (1)
| Charles Johnson
| Decision (unanimous)
| UFC Fight Night: Blaydes vs. Aspinall
| 
| align=center|3
| align=center|5:00
| London, England
|
|-
|Win
| align=center|7–0 (1)
| Cody Durden
| Submission (guillotine choke)
| UFC Fight Night: Volkov vs. Aspinall
| 
| align=center|1
| align=center|0:58
| London, England
|
|-
|Win
| align=center|6–0 (1)
| Blaine O'Driscoll
| Submission (rear-naked choke)
| Brave CF 54
| 
| align=center|2
| align=center|1:36
| Konin, Poland
| 
|-
|NC
| align=center|5–0 (1)
| Ibragim Navruzov
| NC (accidental groin kick)
| Brave CF 51
| 
| align=center|1
| align=center|1:24
| Minsk, Belarus
|
|-
|Win
| align=center|5–0
| Abdul Hussein
| Decision (unanimous)
| Brave CF 49
| 
| align=center|3
| align=center|5:00
| Manama, Bahrain
| 
|-
|Win
| align=center|4–0
| Dave Jones
| TKO (submission to punches)
| Celtic Gladiator 28 
| 
| align=center|3
| align=center|2:11
| Glasgow, Scotland
| 
|-
|Win
| align=center|3–0
| Jamie Kelly
| Submission (rear-naked choke)
| Brave CF 43
| 
| align=center|3
| align=center|2:11
| Manama, Bahrain
|
|-
|Win
| align=center|2–0
| Hayden Sherriff
| TKO (body kick and punches)
| Celtic Gladiator 27
| 
| align=center|1
| align=center|0:51
| Manchester, England
|
|-
|Win
| align=center|1–0
| Glenn McVeigh
| Decision (unanimous)
| Brave CF 37
| 
| align=center|3
| align=center|5:00
| Stockholm, Sweden
| 
|-

|-
|Win
| align=center|23–0
| Abdulla Mubarak
| Submission (rear-naked choke)
| IMMAF 2020 WMMAA Open Championships 
| 
| align=center|1
| align=center|1:29
| Gold Coast, Australia
|
|-
|Win
| align=center|22–0
| Abdulla Alyaqoob
| Decision (unanimous)
| IMMAF 2020 WMMAA Open Championships 
| 
| align=center|3
| align=center|3:00
| Gold Coast, Australia
|
|-
|Win
| align=center|21–0
| Reo Yamaguchi
| Decision (unanimous)
| IMMAF 2019 World Championships 
| 
| align=center|3
| align=center|3:00
| Manama, Bahrain
| 
|-
|Win
| align=center|20–0
| Tynyshtyk Zhanibek
| Decision (unanimous)
| IMMAF 2019 World Championships 
| 
| align=center|3
| align=center|3:00
| Manama, Bahrain
| 
|-
|Win
| align=center|19–0
| Nikolay Atanasov
| Decision (unanimous)
| IMMAF 2019 World Championships 
| 
| align=center|3
| align=center|3:00
| Manama, Bahrain
| 
|-
|Win
| align=center|18–0
| Max Hynninen
| Decision (unanimous)
| IMMAF 2019 World Championships 
| 
| align=center|3
| align=center|3:00
| Manama, Bahrain
| 
|-
|Win
| align=center|17–0
| Mikey Boden
| TKO (punches)
| WCFC3 Championships 
| 
| align=center|2
| align=center|2:10
| Manchester, England
|
|-
|Win
| align=center|16–0
| Myles Richards
| Decision (unanimous)
| Caged Steel Fighting Championship 23
| 
| align=center|3
| align=center|3:00
| Sheffield, England
|
|-
|Win
| align=center|15–0
| Reo Yamaguchi
| Decision (unanimous)
| IMMAF European Championship
| 
| align=center|3
| align=center|3:00
| Rome, Italy
| 
|-
|Win
| align=center|14–0
| Batir Sharukhanov
| Decision (unanimous)
| IMMAF European Senior and Junior Championship
| 
| align=center|3
| align=center|3:00
| Rome, Italy
| 
|-
|Win
| align=center|13–0
| Abanoub Fares
| TKO (punches)
| IMMAF European Senior and Junior Championship
| 
| align=center|1
| align=center|2:32
| Rome, Italy
| 
|-
|Win
| align=center|12–0
| Ciaran Mulholland
| Decision (unanimous)
| UK Fighting Championship
| 
| align=center|3
| align=center|3:00
| Preston, England
|
|-
|Win
| align=center|11–0
| Reo Yamaguchi
| Decision (unanimous)
| IMMAF 2018 World Championships
| 
| align=center|3
| align=center|3:00
| Manama, Bahrain
| 
|-
|Win
| align=center|10–0
| Ismael Zamora
| Decision (unanimous)
| IMMAF World Senior and Junior Championship
| 
| align=center|3
| align=center|3:00
| Manama, Bahrain
| 
|-
|Win
| align=center|9–0
| Imran Satiev
| Submission (rear-naked choke)
| IMMAF  Championship
| 
| align=center|1
| align=center|0:57
| Manama, Bahrain
| 
|-
|Win
| align=center|8–0
| Jack Eglin
| TKO (slam & punches)
| UK Fighting Championships 5
| 
| align=center|2
| align=center|2:25
| Flyweight, England
|
|-
|Win
| align=center|7–0
| Sebastian Gonzalez
| TKO (punches)
| Tanko FC 4
| 
| align=center|1
| align=center|0:37
| Manchester, England
| 
|-
|Win
| align=center|6–0
| Liam Gittins
| Decision (unanimous)
| Tanko FC 3
| 
| align=center|5
| align=center|3:00
| Manchester, England
|
|-
|Win
| align=center|5–0
| Markus Hægland
| Decision (unanimous)
| Tanko FC 2
| 
| align=center|3
| align=center|3:00
| Manchester, England
| 
|-
|Win
| align=center|4–0
| Jose Rufino
| TKO (punches)
| ICE FC 18
| 
| align=center|2
| align=center|1:27
| Bolton, England
| 
|-
|Win
| align=center|2–0
| Ash McCracken
| Decision (unanimous)
| Full Contact Contender 17
| 
| align=center|3
| align=center|3:00
| Manchester, England
| 
|-
|Win
| align=center|1–0
| Jake Hinton
| Submission (rear-naked choke)
| Shinobi War 6
| 
| align=center|1
| align=center|2:25
| Manchester, England
| 
|-

See also 
 List of current UFC fighters
 List of male mixed martial artists
 List of undefeated mixed martial artists

References

External links 
  
 

Kumyks
Dagestani mixed martial artists
Russian male mixed martial artists
English male mixed martial artists
Flyweight mixed martial artists
Mixed martial artists utilizing freestyle wrestling
Mixed martial artists utilizing Brazilian jiu-jitsu
Russian Muslims
English Muslims
Ultimate Fighting Championship male fighters
Russian male sport wrestlers
British male sport wrestlers
Russian practitioners of Brazilian jiu-jitsu
English practitioners of Brazilian jiu-jitsu
Sportspeople from Dagestan
Living people
2000 births